Vitali Maevici (born 3 February 1976 in the Ukrainian SSR) is a former Moldovan football player.

Honours
Nistru Otaci
Moldovan National Division runner-up: 2001–02
Moldovan National Division bronze: 2002–03
Moldovan Cup runner-up: 1996–97, 2001–02, 2002–03

Sheriff Tiraspol
Moldovan National Division runner-up: 1999–2000
Moldovan Cup winner: 1999

References

External links

1976 births
Living people
Moldovan footballers
Moldova international footballers
Moldovan expatriate footballers
Expatriate footballers in Ukraine
FC Sheriff Tiraspol players
FC Elista players
Russian Premier League players
Expatriate footballers in Russia
FC Spartak Vladikavkaz players
FC Haray Zhovkva players
Association football defenders